This is a list of fictional characters appearing in the stories set in the Honor Harrington universe or Honorverse, a best-selling series of over twenty military science fiction novels and anthologies invented and written by David Weber.

The stories in the five existing  anthologies serve to introduce characters, provide a deeper and more complete backstory, and flesh out the universe, so they claim the same canonical relevance as exposition in the main series. Universe creator David Weber serves as editor for the anthologies, maintaining fidelity to the series canons.

 
 Abbot to Adams
 Adcock to Albertson
 Akimoto to Allman
 Alquezar to Anderman, Prince Huang,  Anders, William 'Five' to Archer
 Ariel to Ash
 Ashford to Avshari
 
 Babcock to Bannister
 Banshee to Bellefeuille
 Ben-Fazal to Blaine
 Blanchard to Bouvier
 'Boyce to Brentworth
 Brigham to Burke
 
 Cachat to Canning
 Caparelli to Castellaño
 Casterlin to Chernov
 Chet to Clairdon
 Clairmont to Clinkscales, Howard
 Coatsworth to Corell
 Cortez to Cukor
 
 Dalipagic to D'Arezzo
 Darlington to DeGeorge
 Dekker to Descours
 Desjardins to Detweiler
 DeWitt to Divkovic
 Djerdja to Downey
 Draskovic to DuMorne
 Dunlevy to Duvalier
 
 Earhart to Eisenbrei
 Eisley to Evans
 
 Falco to Ferguson
 Ferrero to Flairty
 Flanagan to Fontein
 Foraker to Fraser
 Freemantle to Fulbright
 
 Gaines to Genda
 Georgides to Gisborne
 Giscard to Gower
 Gozzi to Gregory
 Griggs to Gutierrez
 
 Hagen to Hamer
 Hammitt to Harahap
 Harding to Harper
 Harrington, Dr. Alfred to Harrington, Stephanie
 Harris to Haughton
 Hauptman to Haynesworth
 Hearns to Helpern
 Hemphill to Hernando
 Herrick to Hill
 Hines to Holtz
 Honeker to Howard
 Howell to Hurston
 
 Illyushin to Ito
 
 Jackson to Jankowski
 Janseci to Jeffers
 Jefferson to Jones
 Jordan to Justin
 
 Kaczmarczyk to Kellet
 Kennedy to Kirkegard
 Kleinmeuller to Kuzak
 
 Lababibi to Langtry
 Lao Than to Lecter
 Lemaitre, Antoinette to Lewis
 Lionheart to Luchner
 
 MacAfee to Maddison
 MaGuire to Mangrum
 Manning, Allen to Marston
 Martin to Maybach, Bruce
 Mayhew, Alexandra to Mayhew, Theresa
 Maynard to McKee
 McKeon to Mincio
 Monroe to Mueller
 
 Nagchaudhuri to Nordbrandt
 
 Obrien to Olivetti
 Olson to Oversteegen
 
 Pacelot to Panokulous
 Panowski to Perot
 Pete to Porter
 Preston to Pyne
 
 
 Rabenstrange to Ramirez, R
 Randal to Rhodes
 Rice to Rontved
 Rosenfeld to Ryder
 
 Saganami to Sanderson, W
 Sanford to Schubert
 Schumacher to Shemais
 Sherman to Silvetti
 Simmons, G to Snellgrave
 Sorbanne to Steiner
 Stellingetti to Stokes
 Stone to Sukowski
 Sullivan, L to Sydon
 
 Takahashi to Templeton, G
 Tennard, J to Theodore
 Therret to Thurgood
 Thurman to Tobias
 Tobin to Trajan, Wi
 Tremaine to Truman
 Truscot to Tyler
 
 Ukovski to Usher, Kevin
 
 Vale to Venizelos
 Verrochio to Vorland
 
 Walker to Waters
 Webster to Wexler
 White to Wilson
 Winton-Henke, Anson to Wright
 
 X, Isaac to X, Jeremy
 
 Yammata to Yanakov, Rachel
 Yang, Rachel to Yestremensky
 Younce to Young, Lord Stefan
 Younger to Yviernau
 
 Zachary to Zidaru
 Zilwicki to Zrubek

Explanation of abbreviations 

Other abbreviations:

 ATO: Assistant Tac Officer
 CIP: Council for an Independent Prism
 CO: Commanding Officer
 COLAC: Commanding Officer, LACs
 CN: Caliphate (Zanzibaran) Navy
 CPO: Chief Petty Officer
 DCC: Damage Control Center
 ECM: Electronic CounterMeasures (methods to confuse enemy sensors)
 EN: Erewhon Navy
 ER: Erewhon star system
 EVA: Extra-Vehicular Activity (derived from ancient NASA term)
 EW: Electronic Warfare (also Energy Weapons?)
 HH: Honor Harrington
 INS: Interstellar News Service
 JNMTC: Joint Navy Military Transport Command (SKM)
 KT: Star Kingdom of Torch
 LAC: Light attack craft (not hyper capable)
 MA: Masada star system
 ME: Mesa star system
 MN: Monican Navy
 MO: Monica star system
 OCTO: Officer Candidate Training Officer
 PO: Petty Officer
 ROE: Rules of Engagement
 SAR: Search and Rescue
 SC: Silesian Confederacy
 SBA: Sick Bay Attendant (in RMN)
 SCPO: Senior Chief Petty Officer
 SIS: Special Intelligence Service (SKM term)
 SO: Senior Officer
 SUT: Sustained Use Thruster (usually in context of EVA suit thrusters)
 TC: region near one of the SKM wormhole terminals Talbott Cluster, same as Talbott Quadrant.
 TQ: See TC
 VE: Verge system

A

Abbot to Adams

Adcock to Albertson

Akimoto to Allman

Alquezar to Anderman, Prince Huang

Anders, William 'Five' to Archer

Ariel to Ash

Ashford to Avshari

B

Babcock to Bannister

Banshee to Bellefeuille

Ben-Fazal to Blaine

Blanchard to Bouvier

Boyce to Brentworth

Brigham to Burke

C

Cachat to Canning

Caparelli to Castellaño

Casterlin to Chernov

Chet to Clairdon

Clairmont to Clinkscales, Howard

Coatsworth to Corell

Cortez to Cukor

D

Dalipagic to D'Arezzo

Darlington to DeGeorge

Dekker to Descours

Desjardins to Detweiler

DeWitt to Divkovic

Djerdja to Downey

Draskovic to DuMorne

Dunlevy to Duvalier

E

Earhart to Eisenbrei

Eisley to Evans

F

Falco to Ferguson

Ferrero to Flairty

Flanagan to Fontein

Foraker to Fraser

Freemantle to Fulbright

G

Gaines to Genda

Georgides to Gisborne

Giscard to Gower

Gozzi to Gregory

Griggs to Gutierrez

H

Hagen to Hamer

Hammitt to Harahap

Harding to Harper

Harrington, Dr. Alfred to Harrington, Stephanie

Harris to Haughton

Hauptman to Haynesworth

Hearns to Helpern

Hemphill to Hernando

Herrick to Hill

Hines to Holtz

Honeker to Howard

Howell to Hurston

I

Illyushin to Ito

J

Jackson to Jankowski

Janseci to Jeffers

Jefferson to Jones

Jordan to Justin

K

Kaczmarczyk to Kellet

Kennedy to Kirkegard

Kleinmeuller to Kuzak

L

Lababibi to Langtry

Lao Than to Lecter

Lemaitre, Antoinette to Lewis

Lionheart to Luchner

M

MacAfee to Maddison

MaGuire to Mangrum

Manning, Allen to Marston

Martin to Maybach

Mayhew, Alexandra to Mayhew, Theresa

Maynard to McKee

McKeon to Mincio

Monroe to Mueller

N

Nagchaudhuri to Nordbrandt

O

Obrien to Olivetti

Olson to Oversteegen

P

Pacelot to Panokulous

Panowski to Perot

Pete to Porter

Preston to Pyne

Q

R

Rabenstrange to Ramirez, R

Randal to Rhodes

Rice to Rontved

Rosenfeld to Ryder

S

Saganami to Sanderson, W

Sanford to Schubert

Schumacher to Shemais

Sherman to Silvetti

Simmons, G to Snellgrave

Sorbanne to Steiner

Stellingetti to Stokes

Stone to Sukowski

Sullivan, L to Sydon

T

Takahashi to Templeton, G

Tennard, J to Theodore

Therret to Thurgood

Thurman to Tobias

Tobin to Trajan, Wi

Tremaine to Truman

Truscot to Tyler

U

Ukovski to Usher, Kevin

V

Vale to Venizelos

Verrochio to Vorland

W

Walker to Waters

Webster to Wexler

White to Wilson

Winton-Henke, Anson to Wright

X

X, Isaac to X, Jeremy

Y

Yammata to Yanakov, Rachel

Yang, Rachel to Yestremensky

Younce to Young, Lord Stefan

Younger to Yviernau

Z

Zachary to Zidaru

Zilwicki to Zrubek

References 

Characters